Vasishta Yoga Samhita (also known as Maha-Ramayana, Arsha Ramayana, Vasiṣṭha Ramayana, Yogavasistha-Ramayana and Jnanavasistha.) is a historically popular and influential syncretic philosophical text of Hinduism, dated to the 6th CE or 7th CE — 14th CE or 15th CE. It is attributed to Maharishi Valmiki, but the real author is unknown. The complete text contains over 29,000 verses. The short version of the text is called Laghu yogavāsiṣṭham and contains 6,000 verses.

The text is named after sage Vasistha who is mentioned and revered in the seventh book of the Rigveda, and who was called as the first sage of the Vedanta school of Hindu philosophy by Adi Shankara. The text is structured as a discourse of sage Vasistha to Prince Rama. 

The text consists of six books. The first book presents Rama's frustration with the nature of life, human suffering and disdain for the world. The second describes, through the character of Rama, the desire for liberation and the nature of those who seek such liberation. The third and fourth books assert that liberation comes through a spiritual life, one that requires self-effort, and present cosmology and metaphysical theories of existence embedded in stories. These two books are known for emphasizing free will and human creative power. The fifth book discusses meditation and its powers in liberating the individual, while the last book describes the state of an enlightened and blissful Rama.

Yoga Vasistha teachings are structured as stories and fables, with a philosophical foundation similar to those found in Advaita Vedanta, is particularly associated with drsti-srsti subschool of Advaita which holds that the "whole world of things is the object of mind". The text is notable for expounding the principles of Maya and Brahman, as well as the principles of non-duality, and its discussion of Yoga. The short form of the text was translated into Persian by the 15th-century.

Nomenclature
The name Vasistha in the title of the text refers to Rishi Vasistha. The term Yoga in the text refers to the underlying Yogic theme in its stories and dialogues, and the term is used in a generic sense to include all forms of yoga in the pursuit of liberation, in the style of Bhagavad Gita.

The long version of the text is called Brihat Yoga Vasistha, wherein Brihat means "great or large". The short version of the text is called Laghu Yoga Vasishta, wherein Laghu means "short or small". The longer version is also referred to simply as Yoga Vasistha and by numerous other names such as Vasiṣṭha Ramayana.

Chronology

The date or century of the text's composition or compilation is unknown, and variously estimated from the content and references it makes to other literature, other schools of Indian philosophies. Scholars agree that the surviving editions of the text were composed in the common era, but disagree whether it was completed in the first millennium or second. Estimates range, states Chapple, from "as early as the sixth or seventh century, to as late as the fourteenth century".

The surviving text mentions Vijnanavada and Madhyamaka schools of Buddhism by name, suggesting that the corresponding sections were composed after those schools were established, or about 5th-century. The translation of a version of the text in 14th- to 15th-century into Persian, has been the basis of the other limit, among scholars such as Farquhar in 1922.

Atreya in 1935 suggested that the text must have preceded Gaudapada and Adi Shankara, because it does not use their terminology, but does mention many Buddhist terms. Dasgupta, a contemporary of Atreya, states that the text includes verses of earlier text, such as its III.16.50 is identical to one found in Kalidasa's Kumarasambhava, thus the text must be placed after the 5th-century. Dasgupta adds that the philosophy and ideas presented in Yoga Vasistha mirror those found in Advaita Vedanta of Adi Shankara, but neither mention the other, which probably means that the author(s) of Yoga Vasistha were scholars who lived in the same century as Shankara, placing the text in about 7th- to early 8th-century. The shorter summary version of the text is attributed to the Kashmiri scholar Abhinanda, who has been variously dated to have lived in 9th- or 10th-century.

Evolving text theory
Mainkar states that Yoga Vasistha probably evolved over time. The first work, states Mainkar, was the original ancient work of Vasistha that was an Upanishad with Brahamanical ideas, a work that is lost. This text, suggests Mainkar, was expanded into Moksopaya in or after 6th-century, which is now commonly known as Laghu-Yogavasistha. The Laghu (shorter) version was then expanded into the full editions, over time, in the centuries that followed the completion of Laghu-Yogavasistha. The syncretic incorporation of Buddhism, Jainism and Hinduism ideas happened in the Laghu-Yogavasistha edition, states Mainkar, while ideas from Kashmiri Shaivism, particularly the Trika school, were added to the growing version by the 12th-century. Similar serial expansion, revisions and interpolation is typical in Indian literature. Peter Thomi has published additional evidence in support Mainkar's theory on Yoga Vasistha's chronology.

The oldest surviving manuscript of the Moksopaya (or Moksopaya Shastra) has been dated to have been composed in Srinagar in the 10th century AD.

Author
The text is traditionally attributed to Maharishi Valmiki, the author of Ramayana.

The author of the shorter version, the Laghu-Yogavasistha, is generally considered to be Abhinanda of Kashmir.

Structure

The text exists in many editions of manuscripts with varying number of verses, but similar message. The full editions contain over 29,000, to a few with 32,000 verses, and in some editions about 36,000 verses. An abridged version by Abhinanda of Kashmir (son of Jayanta Bhatta) is Laghu ("Little") Yogavasistha and contains 6,000 verses.

The verses of Yoga Vasistha are structured in the genre of ancient Indian literature, called Grantha. In this genre, each Shloka (verse) in the text is designed to equal 32 syllables, while conveying its message. A Grantha can be sung and depending on its meter, set to specific Raga music. This genre is found in Bhakti movement literature, and Yoga Vasistha's Advaita theories and monism influenced the Grantha literature of Sikhism, whose primary scripture is called Guru Granth Sahib.

The Yoga Vasistha is a syncretic work, containing elements of Vedanta, Yoga, Samkhya, Jainism, Pratyabhijña, and Mahayana Buddhism, thus making it, according to Chapple, "a Hindu text par excellence, including, as does Hinduism, a mosaic-style amalgam of diverse and sometimes opposing traditions".

The text consists of six books:
Book 1: titled Vairagya-prakaranam (Exposition of dispassion), which opens with Rama frustrated with the nature of life, human suffering and disdain for the world.
Book 2: titled Mumukshuvayahara-prakaranam (Exposition of the behavior of the seeker), which describes, through the character of Rama, the desire for liberation, the nature of those who seek such liberation, and the need for self-effort in all spiritual pursuits.
Book 3:  titled Utpatti-prakaranam (Exposition of the arising and birth), describes the birth of all creation as well as the birth of spiritual side of Rama.
Book 4:  titled Sthiti-prakaranam (Exposition of the existence and settling), describes the nature of world and many non-dualism ideas with numerous stories. It emphasizes free will and human creative power.
Book 5: titled Upashama-prakaranam (Exposition of the patience and tranquility), discusses meditation to dissolution of false dualism, to feel oneness and its powers in liberating the individual.
Book 6: titled Nirvana-prakaranam (Exposition of the freedom and liberation), the last book describes the state of an enlightened and blissful Rama. The last book also has large sections on Yoga.

The Nirnaya Sagar version of Yoga Vasistha manuscript has 1146 verses in the first Book, 807 in second, 6304 verses in third, 2414 verses in the fourth book, 4322 in the fifth, while the last is longest with 14,296 verses, for a cumulative total of 29,289 verses.

Content

This is one of the longest Hindu texts in Sanskrit after the Mahabharata, and an important text of Yoga. It consists of numerous short stories and anecdotes used to help illustrate its ideas and message. The text shows the influence of Advaita Vedanta and Saivite Trika school. In terms of Hindu mythology, the conversation in the Yoga Vasishta is placed chronologically before the Ramayana.

The traditional belief is that reading this book leads to spiritual liberation. The conversation between Vasistha and Prince Rama is that between a great, enlightened sage and a seeker of liberation. The text discusses consciousness, cosmology, nature of the universe and consciousness, the ultimate dissolution of body, the liberation of the soul and the non-dual nature of existence.

On Human Intellect 
The Yoga Vāsiṣṭha states the following on the credibility of the provider and seeker of knowledge through these magnificent words.<blockquote>'Even a young boy's words are to be accepted if they are words of wisdom, else, reject it like straw even if uttered by Brahmā the creator.'''</blockquote>

On who is ready for spiritual knowledge
The Yoga Vasistha states that there are four characteristics that mark someone ready for spiritual journey who:

Senses the difference between atman (soul) and non-atman
Is past cravings for anyone or anything, is indifferent to the enjoyments of objects in this world or after
Is virtuous and ethical with Sama (equality), Dama (self-restraint, temperance), Uparati (quietism), Titiksha (patience, endurance), Sandhana (uniting, peace) and Sraddha (faith, trust)
Has Mumukshatawa, that is longing for meaning in life and liberation

On the process of spiritual knowledgeYoga Vasistha teachings are divided into six parts: dispassion, qualifications of the seeker, creation, existence, dissolution and liberation. It sums up the spiritual process in the seven Bhoomikas:
 Śubhecchā (longing for the Truth): The yogi (or sādhaka) rightly distinguishes between permanent and impermanent; cultivates dislike for worldly pleasures; acquires mastery over his physical and mental faculties; and feels a deep yearning to be free from Saṃsāra.
 Vicāraṇa (right inquiry): The yogi has pondered over what he or she has read and heard, and has realized it in his or her life.
 Tanumānasa (attenuation – or thinning out – of mental activities): The mind abandons the many, and remains fixed on the One.
 Sattvāpatti (attainment of sattva, "reality"): The Yogi, at this stage, is called Brahmavid ("knower of Brahman"). In the previous four stages, the yogi is subject to sañcita, Prārabdha and Āgamī forms of karma. He or she has been practicing Samprajñāta Samādhi (contemplation), in which the consciousness of duality still exists.
 Asaṃsakti (unaffected by anything): The yogi (now called Brahmavidvara) performs his or her necessary duties, without a sense of involvement.
 Padārtha abhāvana (sees Brahman everywhere): External things do not appear to exist to the yogi (now called Brahmavidvarīyas); in essence there is a non-cognition of 'objects' as the separation between subject and a distinct object is dissolved; and tasks get performed without any sense of agency (doership). Sañcita and Āgamī karma are now destroyed; only a small amount of Prārabdha karma remains.
 Turīya (perpetual samādhi): The yogi is known as Brahmavidvariṣṭha and does not perform activities, either by his will or the promptings of others.

On liberation
In Chapter 2 of Book VI, titled as The story of Iksvaku, the text explains the state of nirvana (liberation) as follows, "Liberation is peace. Liberation is extinction of all conditioning. Liberation is freedom from every kind of physical, psychological and psychic distress. This world is not seen by the ignorant and the wise in the same light. To one who has attained self-knowledge, this world does not appear as samsara, but as the one infinite and indivisible consciousness".

On Jivanmukta
The Yoga Vasistha describes the Jivanmukta, or liberated person, as follows (abridged from the 1896 translation by KN Aiyer):
 He associates with the wise. He has reached the state of mind, which sees happiness everywhere. To him, neither sacrificial fires, nor Tapas, nor bounteous gifts nor holy waters have any meaning. He is replete with wisdom and friendly to all.
 He is desireless and in his eyes there is nothing supernatural. His state is indescribable and yet he will move in the world like anybody else. His mind will not be bound by any longings after Karmas. He will be indifferent to joy or pains arising from good or bad results. He will preserve a pleasant position in the happy enjoyment of whatever he obtains.
 He is never affected by anything, whether he is in a state of Jiva consciousness or state of Shiva devoid of the Jiva consciousness.
 He is same whether he moves in a family or is a solitary recluse.
 He feels unbound by the delusions of Srutis and Smritis.
 Nothing matters to him, he is unaffected by griefs or pleasures. He is distant, he is close, he in the one Reality of Atman. He is neither clingy nor arrogant.
 He has no fear of anyone, no anger against anyone.
 When the attraction towards external objects ceases, then there yet remains the internal craving which is called Trishna (thirst). The Jivanmukta is beyond Trishna. He is, not becoming. He does not even long for salvation. He is content.
 A Jivanmukta will always transact his present duties, but neither longs for things in the future, nor ruminates upon things of the past.
 He is a child amongst children; as old men amongst the old; as the puissant amongst the puissant; as a youth amongst the young, compassionate and understanding with the grieved.
 In him is found nobleness, benevolence, love, clearness of intellect.

On Samsara and reality

The Yoga Vasistha describes samsara and reality as follows:
 Samsara is mundane existence with rebirths.
 The universe is full of Samsara driven by Moha (delusion), bondage, Tamas (destructive, chaotic behaviors), Mala (impurity), Avidya and Maya.
 Ignorance feeds samsara, self-knowledge liberates.
 Samsara is ephemeral and unreal. With birth, death is inevitable.

Commentaries
The following traditional Sanskrit commentaries on the Yoga Vasistha are extant:
 Vāsiṣṭha-rāmāyaṇa-candrikā by Advayāraṇya (son of Narahari)
 Tātparya prakāśa by ānanda Bodhendra Sarasvatī
 Bhāṣya by Gaṅgādharendra
 Pada candrikā by Mādhava Sarasvatī

Influence
The text, states David Gordon White, has served as a reference on Yoga for medieval era Advaita Vedanta scholars. The Yoga Vasistha, adds White, was one of the popular texts on Yoga that dominated the Indian Yoga culture scene before the 12th-century.

Indian thinker Vinayak Damodar Savarkar has praised Yoga Vasistha in his autobiography "My Transportation For Life":
 "All of a sudden I fell upon the Yoga Vashistha, and I found it of such absorbing interest that I have come to regard it ever since as the best work on the Vedanta Philosophy. The propositions were so logical, the verse is so beautiful, and the exposition is so thorough and penetrating that the soul loses itself in raptures over it. Such a fine combination of philosophy and poetry is a gift reserved only for Sanskrit poets"
"When I used to be lost in the reading of the Yoga Vashistha, the coil of rope I was weaving dropped automatically from my hands; and, for hours on end I lost the sense of possessing the body and the senses associated with that body. My foot would not move and my hand was at a stand still. I felt the deeper yearning to surrender it all. All propaganda, all work seemed such a worthless task, a sheer waste of life. At last the mind and the matter asserted their sway over the body and swung it back to work again"

The practice of atma-vichara, "self-enquiry," described in the Yoga Vasistha, has been popularised due to the influence of Ramana Maharshi, who was strongly influenced by this text.

Translations

Indian languages
Originally written in Sanskrit, the Yoga Vasistha has been translated into many Indian languages, and the stories are told to children in various forms. There are multiple collections of audio, video and mini-articles available on the scripture.

Telugu translations
 Complete translationVasishtha Rama Samvaadam, Sri Yeleswarapu Hanuma Ramakrishna.Yogavasishtha hridayamu in seven Parts by Kuppa Venkata Krishnamurthy, also rendered into English by Vemuri Ramesam.Yoga Vasistha Ratnakaram, Swami Vidya Prakashananda Giri
Copies of the Telugu and English versions were also published by Avadhoota Datta Peetham, Mysore 570025, India

 Malayalam Translations 
Vasishtasudha - Yogavasishtasaram is a translation and commentary in Malayalam by Professor G Balakrishnan Nair

Persian

During the Mughal Dynasty the text was translated into Persian several times, as ordered by Akbar, Jahangir and Darah Shikuh. One of these translations was undertaken by Nizam al-Din Panipati in the late sixteenth century AD. This translation, known as the Jug-Basisht, which has since become popular in Persia among intellectuals interested in Indo-Persian culture. The Safavid-era mystic Mir Findiriski (d. 1641) commented on selected passages of Jug-Basisht.Baha'u'llah on Hinduism and Zoroastrianism: The Tablet to Mirza Abu'l-Fadl Concerning the Questions of Manakji Limji Hataria, Introduction and Translation by Juan R. I. Cole

 Russian 
The unabridged text is currently being translated into Russian and published by Swamini Vidyananda Saraswati, first five books are completed by 2017.

English translationsYoga Vasistha was translated into English by Swami Jyotirmayananda, Swami Venkatesananda, Vidvan Bulusu Venkateswaraulu and Vihari Lal Mitra. K. Naryanaswami Aiyer translated the well-known abridged version, Laghu-Yoga-Vasistha. In 2009, Swami Tejomayananda's Yoga Vasistha Sara Sangrah was published by the Central Chinmaya Mission Trust. In this version the Laghu-Yoga-Vasistha has been condensed to 86 verses, arranged into seven chapters. A list of all known English translations follows:

 1) Complete translation
The Yoga-Vásishtha-Mahárámáyana of Válmiki, Translated by Vihārilāla Mitra (1891-1899), 
The Yoga-Vasishtha Maharamayana of Valmiki in 4 vols. in 7 pts. (bound in 4). Translated by Vihari-Lala Mitra. Reprinted in LPP (Low Price Publications), New Delhi, 1999. ISBN 81-7536-179-4 (set)

Yoga Vasishtha of Valmiki (4 volumes & unabridged). Translated by Vihārilāla Mitra (1891-1899). Edited by Dr. Ravi Prakash Arya (1st. ed. 1998), to include Sanskrit text with english translation. Parimal Publications, Delhi. ISBN 81-7110-151-9 (set) 
An edited version (ed. by Palotas) of the above as e-book (free) is available at https://www.shivabalayogi.org/Books/Yoga_Vasistha.htm

 2) Abbreviated versions

 Abbreviated to about one-third of the original work.
 A shorter version of the above.
The Essence of Yogavaasishtha [Sri Vasishthasangraha]. Compiled by Sri Jnanananda Bharati. Translated by Samvid. Samata Books 1982, 2002. . Printed in India. 344 pp.
Yoga Vasishta Sara (The Essence of Yoga Vasishta). An English Translation from the Sanskrit Original. Sri Ramanasramam, Tiruvannamalai, 1973, 2005. . 36 pp.
The Essence of Yogavaasishtha. Compiled by Sri Jnanananda Bharati. Translated by Samvid. Samata Books 1982, 2002. . 344 pp.
Tejomayananda, Swami: Yoga Vasishta Sara Sangraha. Central Chinmaya Mission Trust, Mumbai 1998
Jyotirmayananda, Swami: Yoga Vasistha. Vol. 1–5. Yoga Research Foundation, Miami 1977. http://www.yrf.org

Portuguese translations
Yoga Vasistha was translated in 2018, from English into Portuguese by Eleonora Meier for Satsang Editora (Brazilian publisher) of the version of Swami Venkatesananda and it is available at www.lojasatsangeditora.com.br  -  - Páginas: 848 Swami Venkatesananda.

Latvian
Vāsišthas joga. Svami Venkatesananda, 2020, 630 pp. A Latvian translation by Inese Kausa, publisher www.svami.lv

 Excerpts 

See also
 Valmiki
 Vasistha

References

Sources

 
 
 

Further reading
 Chapple, Christopher Key; Chakrabarti, Arindam (2015). Engaged Emancipation: Mind, Morals, and Make-Believe in the Moksopaya (Yogavasistha)''. State University of New York Press, Albany. .
  By Vihari Lal Mitra (1891), First Translation
 PDF of Hindi Yoga Vasistha
 PDF of Marathi Yoga Vasistha

External links

 The Yoga-Vasistha of Valmiki with Vasistha Maharamayana - Tatparya Prakasa - The complete Sanskrit scripture in 2 parts, at archive.org
 Yoga Vasistha translated by Swami Venkatesananda (The Supreme Yoga) -archive.org
 Excerpts of Yoga Vasistha with illustrations
 Yoga Vasistha Audio Book (listen online or download audio files free)
 Jog Bashisht - Persian Translation of Yoga Vasistha
 Yoga Vasistha in Sanskrit - Sanskrit verses of Yoga Vasistha at Wikisource library

Hindu texts
Sanskrit texts
Vedanta
Advaita
Ancient yoga texts
Mystical books
Advaita Vedanta texts